James T. Lane (born December 25, 1977) is an American actor and dancer. He made his Broadway debut with the 2006 revival of A Chorus Line, playing Richie Walters. After that, Lane joined the cast of Chicago: The Musical, playing the role of Aaron and Amos Hart . Other credits include an episode on One Life to Live as a James Brown impersonator. Lane was last been seen on Broadway in The Scottsboro Boys, playing the roles of Ozie Powell and Ruby Bates. In 2013, Lane reprised his A Chorus Line role in The West End.

Early life
James T. Lane was born and raised in Philadelphia, Pennsylvania. He attended the Meredith School from kindergarten until 8th grade. During his high school years Lane attended the Girard Academic Music Program. During his teen years, he attended the Ensemble Theatre Community School in Eagles Mere, Pennsylvania. After high school, Lane studied musical theatre at Carnegie-Mellon and Penn State.

Broadway
 Kiss Me, Kate, as Paul, 2019
 King Kong, as Ensemble, 2018
 The Scottsboro Boys, as Ozie Powell/Ruby Bates, 2010
 A Chorus Line, as Richie Walters, 2006–08
 Chicago: The Musical, as Aaron/Amos Hart/Billy Flynn, 2008–10; 2015; 2023

West End
 A Chorus Line, as Richie Walters, 2013
 The Scottsboro Boys, as Ozie Powell/Ruby Bates, 2014–15

Other theatre credits
 Ain't Too Proud: The Life and Times of the Temptations, as Paul Williams - USA tour, 2022
 Triple Threat, as James - Zeiders American Dream Theatre, 2021
 Chicago: The Musical, as Billy Flynn - The MUNY, 2021
 Mary Poppins, as Bert - Drury Lane Theatre, 2019
 Guys and Dolls, as Nicely Nicely - Virginia Stage Company, 2019
 The Wiz, as Tin Man - Broadway at Music Circus, 2019
 Promenade, as 105 - Encores!, 2019
 The Wiz'''', as Tin Man - The MUNY, 2018
 Don't Bother Me, I Can't Cope, as James - Encores!, 2018
 Grand Hotel, as Jimmy2 - Encores!, 2018
 The Little Mermaid, as Sebastian - The MUNY, 2017
 Kiss Me, Kate, as Paul - Hartford Stage/Old Globe, 2015
 Jersey Boys, as Barry Belson - USA tour, 2012
 The Scottsboro Boys, as Ozie Powell/Ruby Bates – San Diego, San Francisco, 2012
 Dreamgirls – Prince Music Theatre, 2005
 Cole Porter's The Pirate – Prince Music Theatre, 2006
 Finian's Rainbow - Walnut Street Theatre
 Fame as Tyrone 
 Cinderella

References

External links
 
 

1977 births
Male actors from Philadelphia
African-American male actors
African-American male dancers
African-American dancers
American male dancers
American male musical theatre actors
Living people
20th-century African-American male singers
21st-century African-American people